The Armash Important Bird Area (also known as Armash Fishponds) is an area of wetland near the town of Armash, in Armenia, in the foothills of Mount Ararat, and on the border with Turkey, and near the borders with Iran and Nakhchivan (an exclave of Azerbaijan). It is designated as an "Emerald Site" wildlife refuge since 2016. The 4,639 ha. site includes 1,514 ha. of ponds used for farming carp, fed by artesian wells and an irrigation canal from the Araks River.

234 bird species have been recorded on the site, with 93 of them breeding. It is the only place in Armenia where White-headed Duck, White-tailed Lapwing, and Kentish Plover have been recorded as breeding. Other notable species present include Marbled Teal, Common Pochard, Ferruginous Duck, Northern Lapwing, Black-tailed Godwit, Turtle Dove, and Pallid Harrier, all of which are globally threatened, as well as Savi's Warbler, Glossy Ibis, Purple Heron, Squacco Heron, White-winged Tern, Blue-cheeked Bee-eater, Hoopoe, Mediterranean short-toed lark, and European Roller.

It is one of eighteen Important Bird Areas in Armenia.

References

External links 

 
 'Dominic's Field Pics' blog post describing a day at the reserve, with pictures.
 'Nomad Birder' blog post describing a day at the reserve, with pictures.

Nature reserves in Armenia
Important Bird Areas of Armenia
Mount Ararat